William Ketcham (May 24, 1819September 14, 1879) was an American lumber merchant and Republican politician.  He served four years in the Wisconsin State Senate (1864–1865, 1868–1869), and was an assistant state treasurer.  His name is sometimes spelled Ketchum in historical documents.

Biography
Born in Jericho, New York, he moved to Wisconsin in 1851 and became involved in the lumber business.  He primarily resided at Buena Vista in Richland County, and purchased a share of the ownership of a local lumber mill.

He served on the County Board of Supervisors, and was elected in 1863 and 1867 to the Wisconsin State Senate.  He was considered an influential Republican in the county, and an ally of Lucius Fairchild.  During Fairchild's gubernatorial terms, Ketcham served as an assistant state treasurer.

He died at his home on September 14, 1879.

References

External links
 

1819 births
1879 deaths
People from Jericho, New York
People from Richland County, Wisconsin
Republican Party Wisconsin state senators
19th-century American politicians